Jetstar Hong Kong was a planned low fare airline, based at Hong Kong International Airport (Currently as a brand used for promoting the sister companies of Jetstar). In June 2015, Hong Kong's Air Transport Licensing Authority refused Jetstar Hong Kong's application for an operating licence.

It was formed in 2012 as a venture between China Eastern Airlines and Qantas. Later, on 6 June 2013, Shun Tak Holdings, a conglomerate in Hong Kong and Macau managed by Pansy Ho invested US$66 million for a 33.3% stake with China Eastern Airlines and Qantas. Jetstar Hong Kong is a subsidiary of Shun Tak Holdings under the Listing Rules.

However, Hong Kong's Air Transport Licensing Authority refused Jetstar Hong Kong's application for an operating licence on 25 June 2015. Subsequently, China Eastern Airlines and Qantas announced the end of its involvement in Jetstar Hong Kong.

Jetstar Hong Kong remains a promotion brand in Hong Kong with an active Facebook page and emphasize their direct flights to Tokyo, Osaka, Singapore, Hanoi and Da Nang.

History

Jetstar Hong Kong lodged an application for an air operator's certificate (AOC) in August 2012. The airline venture originally planned to commence its services in late 2012, but it was awaiting the receipt of approval from the Hong Kong government. Under the Basic Law of Hong Kong, the government has the authority to issue airline licences to companies incorporated in Hong Kong and having their principal place of business in the territory.

On 6 June 2013, it was announced that Shun Tak Holdings had acquired a 33.3% stake in Jetstar Hong Kong. Each investor now held an equal stake in the budget airline. Jetstar Hong Kong had a local CEO, Chairman and Hong Kong Permanent Resident majority Board.

In June 2013, the Transport and Housing Bureau said the government was reviewing the regime for designation of local carriers and it would not process any applications from new airlines before the completion of the review. The Transport and Housing Bureau later said in April 2014 that the Hong Kong government's review on the framework for designation of Hong Kong airlines had been completed.

In February 2014, its Company Registry was updated to reflect the changes made to the shareholders voting structure and the appointment of two new board members from local investor Shun Tak Holdings. Its shareholding structure was changed to give local investor Shun Tak Holdings 51% shareholding voting rights with China Eastern Airlines and Qantas each retaining 24.5%.

As the airline continued to progress through the regulatory approval process, its Air Transport Licence application was gazetted in August 2013 but faced objections from incumbent future competitors Cathay Pacific, Dragonair (now Cathay Dragon), Hong Kong Airlines and Hong Kong Express. A public inquiry into Jetstar Hong Kong's Principal Place of Business (required by law to be Hong Kong) associated with its application for an Air Transport Licence was held in January 2015. As at March 2015, the application was still being considered.

On 25 June 2015, Hong Kong's Air Transport Licensing Authority refused Jetstar Hong Kong's application for an operating license.

On 17 August 2015, China Eastern Airlines ended their involvement in the airline and would no longer invest in the project. Qantas also stopped investment on 20 August 2015.

Proposed Destinations
Jetstar Hong Kong planned to initially serve short-haul routes to cities in China, Japan, South Korea and South East Asia.

Jetstar Hong Kong submitted applications to operate scheduled air services for up to 129 routes out of Hong Kong, according to a document published by the Licensing Authority of Hong Kong. The airline applied for routes to the following:

 Cambodia (2 destinations): Phnom Penh, Siem Reap
 China (48 destinations / 49 airports): Harbin, Changchun, Shenyang, Dalian, Tianjin, Beijing, Hohhot, Baotou, Yinchuan, Taiyuan, Xi’An, Lanzhou, Xining, Ürümqi, Shijiazhuang, Jinan, Qingdao, Yantai, Zhengzhou, Luoyang, Xuzhou, Yancheng, Nanjing, Wuxi, Shanghai Hongqiao, Shanghai Pu Dong, Hangzhou, Ningbo, Wenzhou, Hefei, Tunxi, Wuhan, Changsha, Chongqing, Chengdu, Kunming, Dayong, Nanchang, Guiyang, Lijiang, Fuzhou, Jinjiang, Xiamen, Guilin, Nanning, Shantou, Zhanjiang, Haikou, Sanya
 Indonesia (8 destinations): Medan, Bandung, Jakarta, Semarang, Yogyakarta, Surabaya, Denpasar, Lombok
 Japan (26 destinations / 27 airports): Asahikawa, Kushiro, Tokachi-Obihiro, Sapporo, Hakodate, Akita, Sendai, Niigata, Tokyo-Narita, Tokyo-Haneda, Nagoya, Toyama, Komatsu, Osaka-Kansai, Okayama, Hiroshima, Takamatsu, Matsuyama, Kitakyushu, Fukuoka, Oita, Nagasaki, Kumamoto, Miyazaki, Kagoshima, Okinawa, Ishigaki
 Korea (6 destinations / 7 airports): Seoul Incheon, Seoul Gimpo, Cheongju, Daegu, Busan, Muan, Jeju
 Laos (2 destinations): Vientiane, Luang Prabang
 Malaysia (5 destinations): Kota Kinabalu, Kuching, Langkawi, Penang, Kuala Lumpur
 Myanmar (2 destinations): Yangon, Mandalay
 Philippines (9 destinations): Laoag, Clark, Manila, Kalibo, Iloilo, Cebu, Puerto Princesa, Davao, Cagayan De Oro
 Singapore 
 Taiwan (3 destinations): Taipei-Taoyuan, Taichung, Kaohsiung
 Thailand (7 destinations): Chiang Rai, Chiang Mai, Bangkok, Koh Samui, Krabi, Phuket, Hat Yai
 Vietnam (5 destinations): Hanoi, Da Nang, Hue, Nha Trang, Ho Chi Minh City
 Others (3 destinations): Guam, Saipan, Koror

Fleet
Jetstar Hong Kong purchased nine Airbus A320s. None were delivered, being placed in store at Toulouse-Blagnac Airport. Three were sold in April 2014, followed by a further three in August 2014. In March 2015, a further two were sold to CMB Financial Leasing.

References

Defunct airlines of Hong Kong
Airlines established in 2012
Airlines disestablished in 2015
Defunct low-cost airlines
China Eastern Airlines
Qantas
2012 establishments in Hong Kong
2015 disestablishments in Hong Kong